Yalup Brook  is a former small town located in the South West of Western Australia along the South Western Highway, between Waroona and Harvey. It was also situated on the Perth-Bunbury railway line.

History
The railway line opened in 1893 and a station was established in the late 1890s. A townsite to support local settlers was gazetted in 1912.

Little development occurred as the town is situated so close to Waroona and Wagerup. The name of the town comes from a nearby brook of the same name, first recorded by a surveyor in 1889. The name of Yorlup appears in earlier maps and was recorded as early as 1833.

References

Towns in Western Australia
Shire of Waroona